WellCare Health Plans, Inc. is an American health insurance company that provides managed care services primarily through Medicaid, Medicare Advantage and Medicare Prescription Drug plans for members across the United States.

WellCare began operations in 1985 and has its headquarters in Tampa, Florida. It became a subsidiary of Centene Corporation in January 2020.

History

WellCare began operations in 1985 in Tampa, Florida as a Medicaid provider for the State of Florida. In 1992, Kiran Patel, a cardiologist and entrepreneur, purchased the company.

In 2002, Patel sold it to a NY investment group led by George Soros and Todd Farha. Also in 2002, Todd Farha joined the company as CEO.

In 2004, it became a public company via an initial public offering. In 2006, WellCare began offering Medicare Advantage plans with prescription drug benefits after the signing of the Medicare Prescription Drug, Improvement, and Modernization Act in 2003.

Also in 2006, WellCare began offering Medicare Part D plans.

2007 Florida investigations

On October 24, 2007, law enforcement agents executed a search warrant on WellCare's headquarters in Tampa, FL based on a whistleblower complaint that provided evidence of WellCare inflating patients' treatment costs and not returning overpayments to the state. The complaint also named several employees who knew about the activities.

In 2011, the SEC filed criminal charges against four WellCare executives. In 2013, the executives, including former CEO Todd Farha, were found guilty of the charges, including healthcare fraud and making false statements to law enforcement. Between 2008 and 2012, the company agreed to pay a total of $217.5 million to settle the claims against them.

2008-2019 
In January 2008, Heath Schiesser was promoted to president and CEO, replacing Todd Farha. Schiesser was replaced in December 2009 by Alec Cunningham.

In 2012, WellCare expanded its Medicare business through the acquisition of several companies' Medicare businesses, including Arcadian Health Plan in Arizona and Easy Choice Health Plan in California.

In November 2013, WellCare appointed Chairman David Gallitano to serve as interim CEO.

In 2018, 2019 and 2020 Fortune magazine named WellCare as one of the World's Most Admired Companies.

Centene acquisition 
In January 2020, the company was acquired by Centene Corporation for $17 billion. According to Fierce Healthcare, the merger created one of the largest sponsors of government coverage in the country. Following the merger, WellCare's CFO Andrew Asher became the CFO of Centene and CEO Kenneth Burdick joined the executive team at Centene.

Acquisitions
Since 2012, WellCare has acquired several Medicare & Medicaid supplement providers, including:

 November 2012: Easy Choice Health Plan in California
 February 2013: UnitedHealthcare's Medicaid business in South Carolina
 April 2013: Aetna's Medicaid business in Missouri, Missouri Care
 January 2014: Windsor Health Group
 January 2017: Care1st Health Plan Arizona, a subsidiary of Care1st Health Plan, a Blue Shield of California affiliate.
May 2017: Universal American
 May 2017: Phoenix Health Plan, formerly a subsidiary of Abrazo Community Health Network, a subsidiary of Tenet Healthcare
  September 2018: Meridian Health Plans, Detroit, Michigan
 September 2019: Aetna's Medicare prescription insurance business, as a condition of CVS Health's acquisition of Aetna

See also
 EmblemHealth

References

External links
 

Medicare and Medicaid (United States)
Pharmacy benefit management companies based in the United States
Companies formerly listed on the New York Stock Exchange
Health care companies based in Florida
Companies based in Tampa, Florida
American companies established in 1985
Financial services companies established in 1985
Health care companies established in 1985
1985 establishments in Florida
2004 initial public offerings
2020 mergers and acquisitions
Health insurance companies of the United States
American corporate subsidiaries
Centene Corporation